Michel Richard Cunha dos Prazeres (born July 25, 1981) is a Brazilian mixed martial artist who fights in the Welterweight division. He most notably fought for the Ultimate Fighting Championship (UFC).

Mixed martial arts career

Early MMA career
Prazeres began training MMA at age 12 when he watched his inspiration, Bruce Lee. His MMA career began in 2000, when he won his debut fight by submission. He went on to win his first six fights straight via stoppage. Prazeres built up an undefeated record of 16–0 competing in local and regional promotions across his native Brazil before signing with the UFC in early 2013.

Ultimate Fighting Championship
Upon signing with the UFC, Prazeres made his promotional debut as a short notice injury replacement on May 18, 2013 against Paulo Thiago at UFC on FX: Belfort vs. Rockhold.  Prazeres lost the fight by unanimous decision, giving him his first career loss.

Prazeres next fought Jesse Ronson on September 21, 2013 at UFC 165. He won the fight by a close split decision. It was his first fight outside of his native Brazil.

Prazeres faced Mairbek Taisumov on March 23, 2014 at UFC Fight Night 38, replacing the injured Gleison Tibau. He won the fight by dominant unanimous decision. Taisumov had multiple point deductions and the fight ended up being scored (30-25, 30-25, 30-25) in favor of Prazeres.

Prazeres faced Kevin Lee on February 14, 2015 at UFC Fight Night 60. He lost the fight by unanimous decision.

Prazeres faced Valmir Lázaro on November 21, 2015 at The Ultimate Fighter Latin America 2 Finale. He won the fight by split decision.

Prazeres was expected to face Anthony Rocco Martin on July 23, 2016 at UFC on Fox 20. However, Martin pulled out of the fight in early July citing a neck injury and was replaced by promotional newcomer J.C. Cottrell. He won the fight via unanimous decision.

Prazeres next faced Gilbert Burns on September 24, 2016 at UFC Fight Night 95. He won the fight via unanimous decision.

Prazeres faced Josh Burkman on March 11, 2017 at UFC Fight Night 106. He won the fight via submission in the first round. The win also earned Prazeres his first Performance of the Night bonus award.

Prazeres was expected to face Islam Makhachev on September 2, 2017 at UFC Fight Night 115. However, Makhachev pulled out of the fight in mid-August citing injury and was replaced by promotional newcomer Mads Burnell. At the weigh ins, Prazeres missed the lightweight limit of 156 pounds, coming in at 159 pounds. As a result his bout with Mads Burnell was changed to a catchweight and Prazeres was fined 20% of his purse. Prazeres won the fight by submission in the third round.

Prazeres faced Desmond Green on February 3, 2018 at UFC Fight Night 125.  At the weigh-ins Prazeres weighed in at 161 pounds, 5 pounds over the lightweight non title fight upper limit of 156 pounds. As a result, the bout proceeded at a catchweight and Prazeres was fined 20 percent of his purse to Green. He won the fight via unanimous decision.

Prazeres faced Zak Cummings on May 19, 2018 at UFC Fight Night 129. He won the back-and-forth fight via split decision.

Prazeres faced Bartosz Fabiński on November 17, 2018 at UFC Fight Night 140. He won the fight via guillotine choke submission in the first round.

Prazeres was scheduled to face Ramazan Emeev at UFC Fight Night 145. However, on February 4, 2019 it was reported that Emeev pulled out of the fight, citing injury. He was replaced by newcomer Ismail Naurdiev. Prazeres lost the fight by unanimous decision.

On February 11, 2020, news surfaced that Prazeres tested positive for anabolic agents in two out-of-competition samples on March 9, 2019. Prazeres was handed a two-year ban, making him eligible to return to competition on March 9, 2021.

Prazeres faced Shavkat Rakhmonov on June 26, 2021 at UFC Fight Night 190. He lost the fight via a rear-naked choke in round two.

On December 14, 2021, it was announced that Prazeres had asked for his release from the UFC.

On December 23, 2021, it was announced that Prazeres had accepted a 4 year USADA ban after four different urine samples all tested positive for the banned substances clomiphene and its metabolites (desethyl-clomiphene, clomiphene M1, and clomiphene M2), oxandrolone metabolites, and the exogenous administration of testosterone and/or its precursors in four different out-of-competition tests between Aug. 27 and Nov. 2. Prazeres will be eligible to compete again on Aug. 27, 2025, four years from the date of the initial positive sample. After receiving the suspension, Prazeres briefly decided to retire from MMA, but changed his mind after discovering that USADA can’t stop him from competing in several countries, including Brazil. Prazeres blamed the positive tests on fertility treatment due to his wife having trouble conceiving.

Post UFC 
In his first appearance post UFC, Prazeres faced Stefan Negucić on September 9, 2022 at Serbian Battle Championship 44. He won the bout via unanimous decision.

Personal life
Prazeres has a son.

Before his bout against Desmond Green at UFC Fight Night: Machida vs. Anders, Prazeres's brother Edson Amaral dos Prazeres was killed in an accident in Belem less than two weeks before the fight and week before that, his wife Cassia Andrade dos Prazeres had to undergo surgery a second time for curettage after suffering a miscarriage on Jan. 1st.

Championships and accomplishments 
 Ultimate Fighting Championship
 Performance of the Night (One time) vs. Josh Burkman

Mixed martial arts record

|-
|Win
|align=center|27–4
|Stefan Negucić
|Decision (unanimous)
|Serbian Battle Championship 44
|
|align=center|3
|align=center|5:00
|Belgrade, Serbia
|
|-
|Loss
|align=center|26–4
|Shavkat Rakhmonov
|Submission (rear-naked choke)
|UFC Fight Night: Gane vs. Volkov
|
|align=center|2
|align=center|2:10
|Las Vegas, Nevada, United States
|
|-
|Loss
|align=center|26–3
|Ismail Naurdiev
|Decision (unanimous)
|UFC Fight Night: Błachowicz vs. Santos 
|
|align=center|3
|align=center|5:00
|Prague, Czech Republic
|
|-
|Win
|align=center|26–2
|Bartosz Fabiński
|Submission (guillotine choke)
|UFC Fight Night: Magny vs. Ponzinibbio 
|
|align=center|1
|align=center|1:02
|Buenos Aires, Argentina
|
|- 
|Win
|align=center|25–2
|Zak Cummings
|Decision (split)
|UFC Fight Night: Maia vs. Usman
|
|align=center|3
|align=center|5:00
|Santiago, Chile
|
|-
|Win
|align=center|24–2
|Desmond Green
|Decision (unanimous)
|UFC Fight Night: Machida vs. Anders 
|
|align=center|3
|align=center|5:00
|Belém, Brazil
|
|-
|Win
|align=center|23–2
|Mads Burnell
|Submission (north-south choke)
|UFC Fight Night: Volkov vs. Struve
|
|align=center|3
|align=center|1:26
|Rotterdam, Netherlands
|
|-
|Win
|align=center|22–2 
|Josh Burkman
|Submission (north-south choke)
|UFC Fight Night: Belfort vs. Gastelum
|
|align=center|1
|align=center|1:42
|Fortaleza, Brazil
|
|-
|Win
|align=center|21–2 
|Gilbert Burns
| Decision (unanimous)
|UFC Fight Night: Cyborg vs. Länsberg
|
|align=center| 3
|align=center| 5:00
|Brasília, Brazil
|
|-
|Win
|align=center|20–2
|J.C. Cottrell
|Decision (unanimous)
|UFC on Fox: Holm vs. Shevchenko 
|
|align=center|3
|align=center|5:00
|Chicago, Illinois, United States
| 
|-
|Win
|align=center|19–2
|Valmir Lázaro
|Decision (split)
|The Ultimate Fighter Latin America 2 Finale: Magny vs. Gastelum
|
|align=center|3
|align=center|5:00
|Monterrey, Mexico
| 
|-
|Loss
|align=center|18–2
|Kevin Lee
|Decision (unanimous)
|UFC Fight Night: Henderson vs. Thatch
|
|align=center|3
|align=center|5:00
|Broomfield, Colorado, United States
|
|-
|Win
|align=center|18–1
|Mairbek Taisumov
|Decision (unanimous)
|UFC Fight Night: Shogun vs. Henderson 2
| 
|align=center|3
|align=center|5:00
|Natal, Brazil
|
|-
|Win
|align=center|17–1
|Jesse Ronson
|Decision (split)
|UFC 165
|
|align=center|3
|align=center|5:00
|Toronto, Ontario, Canada
|
|-
|Loss
|align=center|16–1
|Paulo Thiago
|Decision (unanimous)
|UFC on FX: Belfort vs. Rockhold
|
|align=center|3
|align=center|5:00
|Jaraguá do Sul, Brazil
|
|-
|Win
|align=center|16–0
|Leandro Batata
|Decision (unanimous)
|Shooto Brazil 30
|
|align=center|3
|align=center|5:00
|Belém, Brazil
|
|-
|Win
|align=center|15–0
|Sérgio Leal
|Submission (rear-naked choke)
|Jungle Fight 37
|
|align=center|1
|align=center|1:49
|São Paulo, Brazil
|
|-
|Win
|align=center|14–0
|André Luis Lobato
|Decision (unanimous)
|Iron Man Championship 6
|
|align=center|3
|align=center|5:00
|Belém, Brazil
|
|-
|Win
|align=center|13–0
|Antônio Carlos Ribeiro
|Submission (triangle choke)
|Midway Fight
|
|align=center|1
|align=center|N/A
|Belém, Brazil
|
|-
|Win
|align=center|12–0
|Frederick Samurai
|Decision (unanimous)
|Mega Champion Fight 2
|
|align=center|3
|align=center|5:00
|Manaus, Brazil
|
|-
|Win
|align=center|11–0
|Valter de Menezes
|Decision (unanimous)
|Predador FC 5
|
|align=center|3
|align=center|5:00
|São Paulo, Brazil
|
|-
|Win
|align=center|10–0
|Gabriel Santos
|Decision (unanimous)
|Macapa Verdadeiro Vale Tudo
|
|align=center|3
|align=center|5:00
|Macapá, Brazil
|
|-
|Win
|align=center|9–0
|Anderson Banana 
|Submission (rear-naked choke)
|Predador FC 4
|
|align=center|1
|align=center|N/A
|São Paulo, Brazil
|
|-
|Win
|align=center|8–0
|Edilson Florêncio
|Decision (unanimous)
|Midway Fight
|
|align=center|3
|align=center|5:00
|Belém, Brazil
|
|-
|Win
|align=center|7–0
|Ari dos Santos
|Decision (unanimous)
|Ilha Combat
|
|align=center|3
|align=center|5:00
|Macapá, Brazil
|
|-
|Win
|align=center|6–0
|Luis Neto
|Submission (punches)
|Iron Man Vale Tudo 7
|
|align=center|1
|align=center|4:16
|Macapá, Brazil
|
|-
|Win
|align=center|5–0
|Elias Monteiro
|TKO (punches)
|Super Vale Tudo Ananindeua
|
|align=center|1
|align=center|1:17
|Ananindeua, Brazil
|
|-
|Win
|align=center|4–0
|Cleber Santana
|Submission (choke) 
|Super Vale Tudo Ananindeua
|
|align=center|2
|align=center|2:22
|Ananindeua, Brazil
|
|-
|Win
|align=center|3–0
|Rogério Gama
|Submission (rear-naked choke)
|Desafio de Gigantes
|
|align=center|1
|align=center|3:47
|Macapá, Brazil
|
|-
|Win
|align=center|2–0
|Sérgio de Oliveira
|Submission (rear-naked choke)
|Desafio de Gigantes
|
|align=center|1
|align=center|2:13
|Macapá, Brazil
|
|-
|Win
|align=center|1–0
|Sandro Lyon
|Submission (rear-naked choke)
|Open Fight Vale Tudo 2
|
|align=center|1
|align=center|3:58
|Belém, Brazil
|

See also
 List of male mixed martial artists

References

External links
 
 

Brazilian male mixed martial artists
1983 births
Lightweight mixed martial artists
Mixed martial artists utilizing Brazilian jiu-jitsu
Living people
Sportspeople from Belém
Ultimate Fighting Championship male fighters
People awarded a black belt in Brazilian jiu-jitsu
Brazilian practitioners of Brazilian jiu-jitsu